H. portoricensis may refer to:

 Harrisia portoricensis, a cactus endemic to Puerto Rico
 Hohenbergia portoricensis, a bromeliad endemic to Puerto Rico
 Hygrophila portoricensis, a swampweed native to Brazil